Timothy Michael Dolan (born February 6, 1950) is an American cardinal of the Catholic Church. He is the tenth and current archbishop of New York, having been appointed by Pope Benedict XVI in 2009.

Dolan served as the president of the United States Conference of Catholic Bishops from 2010 to 2013 and was elevated to the rank of cardinal in 2012.

The National Catholic Reporter says that Dolan represents conservative values and has a charismatic media personality. He previously served as rector of the Pontifical North American College in Rome from 1994 to 2001, an auxiliary bishop of St. Louis from 2001 to 2002, and archbishop of Milwaukee from 2002 to 2009.

Biography

Early life 
The eldest of five children, Timothy Dolan was born on February 6, 1950, in St. Louis, Missouri, to Robert (1925-1977) and Shirley (née Radcliffe) Dolan (1928-2022) .  His father was an aircraft engineer, working as a floor supervisor at McDonnell Douglas. He has two brothers, one of whom, Bob, is a former radio talk-show host, and two sisters. The family later moved to Ballwin, Missouri, where they attended Holy Infant Roman Catholic Parish.

Dolan exhibited a strong interest in the Roman Catholic priesthood from an early age, once saying, "I can never remember a time I didn't want to be a priest." He would also pretend to celebrate mass as a child.

Dolan entered Saint Louis Preparatory Seminary in Shrewsbury, Missouri, in 1964. He later obtained a Bachelor of Arts in philosophy from Cardinal Glennon College in Shrewsbury, Missouri. He was sent by Cardinal John Carberry to attend the Pontifical North American College in Rome.  Dolan earned the degree of Licentiate of Sacred Theology in 1976 from the Pontifical University of St. Thomas Aquinas.

Priesthood 
Dolan was ordained a priest on June 19, 1976, for the Archdiocese of St. Louis by Auxiliary Bishop Edward O'Meara, . Dolan then served as an associate pastor at Curé of Ars in Shrewsbury and Immacolata Roman Catholic Parish in Richmond Heights until 1979. From there he began his doctoral studies at The Catholic University of America in Washington D.C. under Reverend John Ellis, with a concentration on the history of the church in America. Dolan's thesis centered on Bishop Edwin O'Hara of Kansas City, and was eventually published in book form. Upon Dolan's return to Missouri, he performed pastoral work from 1983 to 1987.  During this time he collaborated with Archbishop John L. May in reforming the archdiocesan seminary.

Dolan was then named secretary of the Apostolic Nunciature in Washington, D.C., serving as a liaison between American dioceses and the nunciature. In 1992, he was appointed vice-rector of Kenrick-Glennon Seminary, where he also served as spiritual director and taught Church history. He was also an adjunct professor of theology at St. Louis University in St. Louis.

Rector of Pontifical North American College 
From 1994 until June 2001, Dolan held the office of rector of the Pontifical North American College in Rome. During his tenure he published Priests for the Third Millennium, and taught at the Pontifical Gregorian University and the Angelicum. He also was granted the title of Monsignor by Pope John Paul II in 1994.

Auxiliary Bishop of St. Louis 

On June 19, 2001, Dolan was appointed auxiliary bishop of  the Archdiocese of St. Louis and Titular Bishop of Natchesium by Pope John Paul II. He received his episcopal consecration on August 15, 2001, from Archbishop Justin Rigali, with Bishop Joseph Naumann and Michael Sheridan serving as co-consecrators. Dolan chose as his episcopal  motto: Ad Quem Ibimus, meaning, "Lord, To Whom Shall We Go?".

Archbishop of Milwaukee 
On June 25, 2002, Dolan was named the tenth Archbishop of the Archdiocese of Milwaukee. He was installed at the Cathedral of St. John the Evangelist in Milwaukee on August 28, 2002. Dolan said he was challenged and haunted by the sexual abuse scandal in that diocese, which broke during his tenure. According to WTAQ news, "An attorney says at least 8,000 kids were sexually abused by over 100 priests and other offenders in the Milwaukee Catholic Diocese."

Dolan took a special interest in priests and vocations, and the number of seminary enrollments rose during his tenure. In an outdoor mass in September 2002, Dolan briefly wore a "cheesehead" hat in tribute to the Green Bay Packers during his homily. He also wrote Called to Be Holy (2005) and To Whom Shall We Go? Lessons from the Apostle Peter (2008), and co-hosted a television program with his brother called Living Our Faith.

In June 2012 it was revealed that Dolan "authorized payments of as much as $20,000 to sexually abusive priests as an incentive for them to agree to dismissal from the priesthood when he was the archbishop of Milwaukee" and that "the archdiocese did make such payments..., thereby allowing the church to remove them from the payroll."

Apostolic Administrator of Green Bay 
On September 28, 2007, Dolan was appointed as the apostolic administrator of the Roman Catholic Diocese of Green Bay. He continued in this position until he resigned on July 9, 2008, on the appointment of David L. Ricken as Bishop of Green Bay.

Archbishop of New York 

On February 23, 2009, Dolan was appointed the tenth archbishop of the Archdiocese of New York by Pope Benedict XVI. The nation's second-largest archdiocese (after the Roman Catholic Archdiocese of Los Angeles), it serves over 2.5 million Roman Catholics. He succeeded Cardinal Edward Egan, who reached the mandatory retirement age of 75 in 2007. According to Dolan, he was informed of his appointment "nine, ten days" prior to the official announcement. Recalling the phone call he received from Apostolic Nuncio Pietro Sambi, as opposed to his appointments as Auxiliary Roman Catholic Bishop of St. Louis and Archbishop of Milwaukee when Dolan was told that the Pope (John Paul II) "would like [him] to" take the posts, he said that Sambi "was quite factual" in that he told him that "the Pope (Benedict XVI) had appointed [him]" to New York, giving Dolan little choice other than to accept.

Before Dolan's appointment, his name had been repeatedly mentioned as a possible successor to Egan, but he downplayed such speculation, saying, "Anytime there's kind of a major see that opens, what have we seen with Washington, Baltimore, Detroit, now New York, my name for some reason comes up. I'm flattered." John L. Allen Jr., Vatican correspondent for the National Catholic Reporter, has noted that Pope Benedict's appointment of Dolan, like those of Donald Wuerl, Edwin O'Brien, and Dennis Schnurr, follows a pattern of choosing prelates "who are basically conservative in both their politics and their theology, but also upbeat, pastoral figures given to dialogue."

Dolan pledged to challenge anti-Catholic sentiment, especially claims that the Church is unenlightened because it opposes same-sex marriage and abortion rights for women. He hoped to build confidence among people affected by the sexual abuse scandals, which he described as "a continuing source of shame".

In 2003, Dolan was admitted to the Order of Malta with the rank of Grand Cross Conventual Chaplain ad honorem. Since 2009 he has served as chief chaplain of the American Association of the Order of Malta. In 2012 he was promoted to the rank (reserved for cardinals) of Bailiff Grand Cross of Honour and Devotion.

Dolan was formally installed as Archbishop of New York at St. Patrick's Cathedral on April 15, 2009. He wore the pectoral cross used by his 19th-century predecessor, Archbishop John Hughes. In attendance were eleven cardinals and several New York elected officials. He received the pallium, a vestment worn by metropolitan bishops, from Pope Benedict XVI on June 29, 2009, in a ceremony at St. Peter's Basilica.

Soon after his arrival in New York, Dolan oversaw a widely consultative pair of "strategic planning" processes, examining the archdiocese's hundreds of grade schools ("Pathways to Excellence", 2009–2013) and parishes ("Making All Things New", 2010–2015). Ultimately, Dolan announced that dozens of underutilized schools and parishes would close or merge with others in their neighborhoods, due to decades-long trends of shifting populations, increasing expenses, declining attendance, and decreasing clergy.

Dolan served as chairman of the board of directors of Catholic Relief Services, in which capacity he visited Ethiopia and India, until his election as president of the U.S. Conference of Catholic Bishops, and he remains a member of the Board of Trustees of The Catholic University of America. Within the Conference of Bishops, he chairs the Priestly Life and Ministry Committee and sits on the Subcommittee on the Church in Africa. In November 2007, he lost the election for Vice President of the Conference, being defeated by Bishop Gerald Kicanas by a margin of 22 votes.

Dolan was the apostolic visitor to Irish seminaries as part of the Apostolic visitation to Ireland following the 2009 publication of the Ryan and Murphy Reports on sexual abuse. Dolan was part of a team that included Cardinal Cormac Murphy-O'Connor, archbishop emeritus of Westminster; Cardinal Seán Patrick O'Malley of Boston; Toronto's Archbishop Thomas Christopher Collins; and Ottawa's Archbishop Terrence Prendergast. They reported their findings to Pope Benedict XVI in 2012.

On January 5, 2011, Dolan was appointed among the first members of the newly created Pontifical Council for Promoting the New Evangelization.

On December 11, 2011, he was awarded the rank of Knight Grand Cross of the Order of Saints Maurice and Lazarus by Victor Emmanuel, Prince of Naples.

From 2011 to 2012, Dolan led a root-and-branch review of all structures and processes at the Pontifical Irish College in Rome. His report was highly critical of the college, as a result of which three Irish members of the staff were sent home and a fourth resigned. Four Irish archbishops, Cardinal Seán Brady, Archbishop of Armagh; the Archbishop of Dublin, Diarmuid Martin; the Archbishop of Tuam, Michael Neary; and the Archbishop of Cashel, Dermot Clifford, were sent a copy of the visitation report by the Vatican. A response prepared for them said "a deep prejudice appears to have coloured the visitation and from the outset it led to the hostile tone and content of the report". The report said "a disturbingly significant number of seminarians gave a negative assessment of the atmosphere of the house". Staff, it added, were "critical about any emphasis on Rome, tradition, the magisterium, piety or assertive orthodoxy, while the students are enthusiastic about these features". A change in the staff was recommended. Elsewhere the report said: "The apostolic visitor noted, and heard from students, an 'anti-ecclesial bias' in theological formation."

On December 29, 2011, Dolan was appointed a member of the Pontifical Council for Social Communications for a five-year renewable term. On April 21, 2011, he was appointed a member of the Congregation for the Oriental Churches.

In 2012, Dolan expressed his public disappointment in the contraceptive mandate promulgated by the Administration of President Barack Obama. In a televised CBS interview, Dolan condemned what was, in his view, government interference that dismissed the right to religious conscience and religious freedom regarding the mandatory compulsion of religious groups and organizations to provide abortifacient drugs and contraception insurance coverage to its employees, despite those items being against the moral tenets of the Roman Catholic faith. After the rule was revised by the Obama Administration, Dolan said the "first decision was a terribly misguided judgment" and said the new rule was "a first step".

On January 24, 2012, Dolan went on a religious pilgrimage to Israel and the West Bank, where he met the then Latin Patriarch of Jerusalem, Fouad Twal.

On November 30, 2013, Pope Francis named Dolan a member of the Congregation for Catholic Education.

On September 3, 2014, Dolan denied requests by the Diocese of Peoria to receive the remains of Archbishop Fulton Sheen, who was entombed in St. Patrick's Cathedral, renewing the historical controversy over Sheen's body and effectively suspending Sheen's cause for sainthood. On November 17, 2016, Judge Arlene Bluth of the New York State Supreme Court ordered Sheen's remains transferred from St. Patrick's Cathedral in New York to St. Mary's Cathedral in Peoria, Illinois.

On September 13, 2014, Dolan was appointed a member of the Congregation for the Evangelization of Peoples.

On November 2, 2015, the American Jewish Committee (AJC) presented its Isaiah Award for Exemplary Interreligious Leadership to Dolan in recognition of "his steadfast contribution and ongoing commitment to the relationship between our respective faiths".

At the inauguration of President Trump on January 20, 2017, Dolan gave the first benediction. His invocation involved a recitation of King Solomon's prayer from the Book of Wisdom.

Dolan completed a pilgrimage to the Knock Shrine in Ireland in 2015.  On May 13, 2017, he celebrated a requiem mass when Tim Curry, the youngest witness to the Knock apparition, was reinterred in St. Patrick's Old Cathedral cemetery in Lower Manhattan after being disinterred from an unmarked grave on Long Island.

President of the U.S. Conference of Catholic Bishops 

Dolan was elected on November 16, 2010, to the presidency of the United States Conference of Catholic Bishops (USCCB) becoming the first New York bishop to attain the post. Dolan replaced Cardinal Francis George, who did not run for re-election. In a vote of 128–111, Dolan beat out nine others, including Bishop Gerald Kicanas of Tucson, Arizona, to win the three-year term. Dolan took office two days later and served until November 12, 2013.

Cardinal 
On January 6, 2012, Pope Benedict XVI announced that Dolan would be created a cardinal at the consistory held on February 18, 2012. Archbishop Dolan was elevated to the rank of cardinal by Pope Benedict on February 18, 2012. The day prior, he addressed the pope and the College of Cardinals on spreading the faith in a secularized world. He was created Cardinal Priest of Nostra Signora di Guadalupe a Monte Mario. He was the first Archbishop of New York since 1946 not to receive the titular church of Santi Giovanni e Paolo, as that title was still being held by his predecessor Cardinal Egan.

After  Benedict XVI announced his retirement due to ill health, effective February 28, 2013, Dolan was named in the press as a papabile, a plausible successor for election to the papacy. However, on March 13, 2013, the conclave instead elected Cardinal Jorge Mario Bergoglio, who took the name Pope Francis.

Views

Race and police issues
On June 2, 2020, Cardinal Dolan spoke on his podcast regarding the protests and police action following the murders of George Floyd and Ahmaud Arbery, and the shooting of Breonna Taylor. In this podcast interview, he attempted to speak to both protesters and police. He argued that police were mostly good people, even comparing them to priests. He also said that the protesters had an important message. He said that black lives matter, bracketing the statement before and after with "all lives matter" and "police lives matter."

In a June 28, 2020 Wall Street Journal opinion piece, Dolan argued against removing statues of historical figures because they had upheld slavery or owned slaves, stating "If we only honor perfect, saintly people of the past, I guess I’m left with only the cross. And some people would ban that." This followed weeks of protests in which monuments commemorating figures that the protesters associated with slavery and colonialism had been removed by protestors and civic leaders.

In an opinion piece for the New York Post published on July 1, 2020, Dolan called for an end to the demonization of the New York City Police Department. He said that "the most stinging rebuke" of the murder of George Floyd by a policeman in Minneapolis "comes fromguess who? The cops I chat with on the sidewalks of New York." He wrote that "in a recent meeting with community activists, one black leader reminded us, 'Don't give me this "get-rid-of-the-cops" rant! You on Madison Avenue or Park Avenue might not need the police. We up in The Bronx sure do!'"

Abortion and LGBT issues
In November 2009, Dolan signed an ecumenical statement known as the Manhattan Declaration, calling on evangelicals, Roman Catholics and Orthodox not to comply with rules and laws permitting abortion, same-sex marriage and other matters that go against their religious consciences. It calls for civil disobedience from Christian officials and laymen on these issues.

In October 2017, Auxiliary Bishop John O'Hara intervened on behalf of Dolan to prohibit a New York parish church from hosting the International Human Rights Art Festival because of its gay and transgender content. The director of the festival declined to remove the two performances that the Archdiocese specifically objected to, and instead moved the entire show to an Episcopal church in Brooklyn.

War and capital punishment
While noting that the "Church has weighed in" against the war in Iraq and capital punishment, Dolan defended his silence regarding President George W. Bush's 2001 appearance at Notre Dame by saying, "Where President Bush would have taken positions on those two hot-button issues that I'd be uncomfortable with, namely the war and capital punishment, I would have to give him the benefit of the doubt to say that those two issues are open to some discussion and are not intrinsically evil. In the Catholic mindset that would not apply to abortion."

Sexual abuse scandal
In 2002, the St. Louis archbishop assigned Dolan to investigate Roman Catholic priests accused of sexual misconduct in the archdiocese. During the investigation, Dolan spoke with parishes, victims, and the media about the scandals, and invited victims of clerical abuse to come forward. Commenting on his meetings with them, Dolan said "it is impossible to exaggerate the gravity of the situation, and the suffering that victims feel, because I've spent the last four months being with them, crying with them, having them express their anger to me." Dolan dismissed abusive priests, which earned him the ire of some St. Louis parishioners who remained loyal to their dismissed priests and referred to Dolan's investigation as a "witch hunt".

In a 2003 letter to Cardinal Joseph Ratzinger, requesting that the Vatican process be expedited for the laicization of priests who he believed were "remorseless and a serious risk to children", Dolan wrote: "As victims organize and become more public, the potential for true scandal is very real." In May 2012, The New York Times revealed that the Archdiocese of Milwaukee, then headed by Dolan, had paid some abusive priests – although already dismissed from their priestly duties – up to $20,000 to leave the priesthood immediately rather than force the church to initiate time-consuming and expensive laicization proceedings against them. The archdiocese noted that the "unassignable priests" were still receiving full salaries and would continue to do so until they were formally laicized; and that the payouts were a "motivation" so that the priests would not contest being defrocked. The Survivors Network of those Abused by Priests sent a formal protest asking, "In what other occupation, especially one working with families and operating schools and youth programs, is an employee given a cash bonus for raping and sexually assaulting children?" Dolan had previously responded to accusations that he had given "payoffs" to accused priests as "false, preposterous and unjust".

In 2011, Dolan thanked the head of the Catholic League, Bill Donohue, for a press release, reproduced on the Archdiocese of New York website, in which Donohue referred to the non-profit support group Survivors Network of those Abused by Priests as a "phony victims' group".

In July 2013, documents made public during bankruptcy proceedings for the Archdiocese of Milwaukee showed that Dolan had sought permission to move $57 million in church funds to prevent them from being accessed by victims of clerical abuse. In a 2007 letter to the Vatican requesting permission to move the funds, Dolan wrote "By transferring these assets to the trust, I foresee an improved protection of these funds from any legal claim and liability." Dolan had previously denied that he tried to shield assets from child sex abuse victims claiming compensation, calling the accusations "old and discredited" and "malarkey." The Vatican approved the request in five weeks.

In 2018 after the Pennsylvania report and the McCarrick scandal, a CNN interviewer asked Dolan whether homosexuality was a cause of the abuse. He answered: "I don't think that's the sole root of it. The sole root of it is a lack of chastity, a lack of virtue. This isn't about right or left. This isn't about gay or straight. This is about right and wrong."

In 2019, Dolan was reported to have received, together with other influential U.S. Catholic leaders, substantial monetary gifts from West Virginia bishop Michael J. Bransfield, who had resigned following allegations of sexual misconduct. Bransfield's diocese had reimbursed him for the gifts. Although Dolan did not reply to a request for comment, other bishops reported that they did not know that Bransfield had been reimbursed by the diocese or that he was accused of sexual misconduct at the time that they received the gifts, and that they had returned the funds or given them to charity.

Terrorism
Dolan visited Ground Zero, the site of the September 11 attacks, the week after his installation as Archbishop of New York. After reciting the same prayer used by Benedict XVI during his visit to the United States, Dolan remarked, "We'll never stop crying. But it's also about September 12th and all the renewal and rebuilding and hope and solidarity and compassion that symbolizes this great community and still does."

Letter to all cardinals 
In July 2020, conservative author George Weigel's book The Next Pope: The Office of Peter and a Church in Mission was sent to all 222 cardinals with an accompanying letter from Cardinal Dolan stating: "I am grateful to Ignatius Press for making this important reflection on the future of the Church available to the College of Cardinals." Some cardinals saw this as a violation of the 1996 apostolic constitution Universi Dominici gregis in which Pope John Paul II "forbid(s) anyone, even if he is a Cardinal, during the Pope's lifetime and without having consulted him, to make plans concerning the election of his successor." Dolan had earlier been critical of the way Pope Francis had organized the 2015 Synod on the Family.  Weigel replied that his book "...does not contain a single sentence about a future conclave. No potential candidates are named and no conclave strategy is discussed. The book is a reflection on the future of the Office of Peter in what Pope Francis has called a Church 'permanently in mission'. Period."

Distinctions
 Knight Grand Cross of Justice of the Sacred Military Constantinian Order of Saint George
 Knight Grand Cross of the Order of Saints Maurice and Lazarus
 Bailiff Grand Cross of Honour and Devotion of the Order of Malta

Published books
Dolan, Fr. Timothy M. (1992).  Some Seed Fell on Good GroundThe Life of Edwin V. O'Hara.  Washington, D.C.:  Catholic University of America Press. .
Dolan, Fr. Timothy M. (circa 1993).  A Century of Papal Representation in the United States.  South Orange, New Jersey:  Immaculate Conception Seminary School of Theology of Seton Hall University.  .
Dolan, Monsignor Timothy M. (2000). Priests For The Third Millennium.  Huntington, Indiana:  Our Sunday Visitor.  . (A collection of talks given to the seminarians and priests at the Pontifical North American College, a school in Rome, Italy, for Roman Catholic seminarians and priests.)
Dolan, Archbishop Timothy M.; Roman Catholic Archdiocese of St. Louis (2001).  Archdiocese of St. LouisThree Centuries of Catholicism, 1700–2000. Strasbourg, France: .  .
Dolan, Archbishop Timothy M. (2005). Called to Be Holy.  Huntington, Indiana:  Our Sunday Visitor.  .
Dolan, Archbishop Timothy M. (2007).  Advent ReflectionsCome, Lord Jesus!. Huntington, Indiana:  Our Sunday Visitor.  .
Dolan, Archbishop Timothy M. (2009).  Doers of the WordPutting Your Faith into Practice.  Huntington, Indiana:  Our Sunday Visitor. .
Dolan, Archbishop Timothy M. (2009). To Whom Shall We Go?Lessons from the Apostle Peter.  Huntington, Indiana:  Our Sunday Visitor. .

See also

 Catholic Church hierarchy
 Catholic Church in the United States
 Historical list of the Catholic bishops of the United States
 List of Catholic bishops of the United States
 Lists of patriarchs, archbishops, and bishops

References

External links

 
 (personal website)
Profile at the Archdiocese of New York website

Article on Dolan's installation as archbishop from the Milwaukee Journal Sentinel
Priestly Life and Ministry Committee , at the United States Conference of Catholic Bishops website
Subcommittee on the Church in Africa , at the United States Conference of Catholic Bishops website

 

1950 births
Living people
21st-century American cardinals
American Roman Catholic clergy of Irish descent
American anti-same-sex-marriage activists
Roman Catholic archbishops of Milwaukee
Cardinals created by Pope Benedict XVI
Kenrick–Glennon Seminary alumni
Knights Grand Cross of the Order of Saints Maurice and Lazarus
Members of the Congregation for the Evangelization of Peoples
Members of the Congregation for the Oriental Churches
Members of the Pontifical Council for Social Communications
Members of the Pontifical Council for the Promotion of the New Evangelisation
Clergy from St. Louis
Pontifical North American College alumni
Pontifical North American College rectors
Pontifical University of Saint Thomas Aquinas alumni
Roman Catholic archbishops of New York
Roman Catholic Archdiocese of St. Louis
Catholic University of America alumni
Writers from Missouri
Writers from New York City
Writers from Milwaukee
Manhattan Institute for Policy Research